Shanaghy is a townland to the east of Ballina in County Mayo, Ireland. It is in the parish of Kilmoremoy, and is part of Ardnaree for the purposes of Gaelic Athletic Association. It begins at the top of Ardnaree and extends eastwards along the main Bonniconlon Road, where it is bordered by the townlands of Mullauns, Rathkip and Behy. The exact border with Rathkip is often quite difficult to define, with the old course of the River Brusna being the boundary. In general, the south bank of the river is Shanaghy, however the course has changed over time and some houses on the South of the River Brusna would be considered Rathkip.

Ballina Suburb
Much of Shanaghy is now part of the Ballina Urban Area. Indeed, after recent boundary changes much of Shanaghy is also part of the Ballina Town Council Electoral Area. In addition, several housing estates have been built in Shanaghy, serving the expanding housing needs of Ballina. Shanaghy Heights is the most established of these, and has grown over the years. Other estates such as Mossgrove Village have been built beside Ballina Golf Links also.

References

Townlands of County Mayo